Benoît Laffineur (born 30 October 1957) is a French former swimmer. He competed in the men's 4 × 200 metre freestyle relay at the 1976 Summer Olympics.

References

External links
 

1957 births
Living people
Olympic swimmers of France
Swimmers at the 1976 Summer Olympics
Place of birth missing (living people)
French male freestyle swimmers